Chura kampo (Tibetan dried cheese) is a Tibetan cheese and important within the cuisine of Tibet. Chura kampo is made from the curds left over from boiling buttermilk.

There are many possible shapes for chura kampo. Small pieces of Chura kampo are eaten similarly to how candy bars are eaten in Western countries. This cheese is composed of little chunks of dried hard cheese that last long when it is chewed.

See also
 Chura loenpa (soft Tibetan cheese)
 List of cheeses
 List of Tibetan dishes
 Tibetan culture

References
Dorje, Rinjing (1985) Food in Tibetan Life, Banyan Press, page 96

External links
Allen, Bryan and Silvia, Kaas maken en Bai-cultuur Tibetan cheese 

Tibetan cuisine
Tibetan cheeses